Ch'uñawi (Aymara for a place where potatoes are spread as part of the procedure to prepare ch'uñu, also spelled Chunahui, Chuñahui) is a mountain in the Bolivian Andes which reaches a height of approximately . It is located in the Cochabamba Department, Quillacollo Province, Sipe Sipe Municipality. Ch'uñawi lies southeast of Tikrasqa.

References 

Mountains of Cochabamba Department